Maria Ritter (born 2 August 1957) is a Liechtenstein middle-distance runner. She competed in the women's 800 metres at the 1976 Summer Olympics.

References

1957 births
Living people
Athletes (track and field) at the 1976 Summer Olympics
Liechtenstein female middle-distance runners
Olympic athletes of Liechtenstein
Place of birth missing (living people)